The following is the list of all the heads of state of Costa Rica. The current Constitution establishes that the President of Costa Rica is both head of state and head of government, and the current officeholder is Rodrigo Chaves Robles of the Social Democratic Progress Party.

First independent governments (1821–1824) 

On October 11, 1821, the province of Costa Rica proclaimed its absolute independence from Spain. On the 29th of that month, the city of Cartago, head of the Partido de Costa Rican, also signed an act declaring the absolute independence of the Spanish Government.

During this period the main divisions occurred between two sides; the imperialist who sought to annex Costa Rica to the First Mexican Empire and the Republican who sought full independence from Costa Rica. The monarchicals or monarchists also advocated the recognition of Agustín de Iturbide as emperor.

Emperor (1822–1823)

President of the Federal Republic of Central America (1823–1839) 

Between 1824 and 1838 Costa Rica was a member of the Federal Republic of Central America, and the president was the federal president of the country, although the political influence of the federal government was minimal.

Heads of State of Costa Rica (1824–1847)
Between 1824 and 1847 and according to the Constitutions of the United Provinces of Central America (1824), of Costa Rica from 1825 and 1844, the chief of the executive branch bore the title of supreme chief or first chief.

Liberals almost completely dominated Costa Rican politics during this period, to the point that many historians call this the "Liberal State". In Costa Rica there was no war between liberals and conservatives as was common in the rest of Latin America and even coup d'etats and de facto governments were mostly between liberal factions. The only conservative president of this period was José Rafael de Gallegos y Alvarado who did not end his term. Another conservative, Nicolás Ulloa Soto, never took office.ref>Msc. Marvin Carvajal Barrantes.

President of the State of Costa Rica (1847–1848)

President of the Republic of Costa Rica (1848–1948)

Current title of the head of state and government since the Constitution of 1847. The historiography tends to divide this historical period in two, the previous one to the civil war of 1948 and the subsequent one to it. During the first period from 1847 to 1948, the liberals almost completely dominated Costa Rican politics. The liberal hegemony only broke briefly with the government of Vicente Herrera Zeledón (who however had been elected by the liberals) who ruled de facto for just over a year between 1876 and 1877. Even the dictator Federico Tinoco whose dictatorship lasted two years was also liberal. In addition, Costa Rican politics was then (and continues to be to some extent) eminently personalist, so political parties such as Civil, National, Peliquista and Republican revolved mostly around leaders and political figures and not ideologies although, in general terms, they usually be diffusely associated with liberalism.

Costa Rican liberalism was also closely linked to the coffee-growing oligarchy and an important sector of the aristocracy. Attempts to create party alternatives not only formally ideological but more to the left were the Reform Party of Father Jorge Volio Jiménez, strongly influenced by the Catholic social teaching and Christian socialism and Manuel Mora Valverde's Workers and Peasants Block (which precisely it would break with the Reform Party after Volio's alliance with the liberal Ricardo Jiménez Oreamuno of the Republican Party) that would lead to the Costa Rican Communist Party. However, even after the war, an important influence of liberal thinking could be seen in the presidents emanated from opposition coalitions as well as within the Social Christian Unity Party.

The National Republican Party led several liberals to the presidency, however, it would be under the government of perhaps its most famous president Rafael Ángel Calderón Guardia that the reforms known as the Social Guarantees would be given for the benefit of the poorest classes and would be one of the triggers of the war of 48.

Founding Junta of the Second Republic (1948–1949)

After the rupture of the constitutional order in 1948 when the third and last Costa Rican civil war broke out, the victorious side formed by the National Liberation Movement exercised de facto power for 18 months under the self-appointed Founding Junta of the Second Republic chaired by José Figueres Ferrer who proclaimed the beginning of the Second Costa Rican Republic.

President of the Republic of Costa Rica (1949-today)
José Figueres would hand over the Executive Power to Otilio Ulate Blanco on November 8, 1949 as the alleged winner of the 1948 elections whose annulment by the government of Teodoro Picado and Rafael Ángel Calderón Guardia caused the civil war of the same year. A National Constituent Assembly was also convened that drafted the 1949 Constitution, still in force, and also created the official positions of First and Second Vice presidents of the Republic.

The National Liberation Party, of social democratic ideology and led by the war-winning leader José Figueres Ferrer would become the main political force after 48, but both Calderonistas and liberals would remain active allying with each other, which would allow the governments of Mario Echandi Jiménez and José Joaquín Trejos Fernández. Following the merger of almost all the antiliberacionista opposition grouped in the Unity Coalition in the Social Christian Unity Party in 1983, this party and the National Liberation would form a solid bipartisanism so that all presidents between 1982 and 2014 belonged to one of these two parties. It is in 2014 that bipartisanship is broken with the coming to power of Luis Guillermo Solís Rivera, first president of the post-bipartisan stage and belonging to a party that was not linked to the two major traditional political tendencies (liberationism and calderonism) the Citizens' Action Party that had already been the main opposition force for two previous periods.

References

Presidents of Costa Rica
Costa Rica
Heads of state